(born December 11, 1991) is a Japanese professional baseball player for the Orix Buffaloes of the Nippon Professional Baseball (NPB). He has previously played in NPB for the Hokkaido Nippon-Ham Fighters.

Career

Hokkaido Nippon-Ham Fighters
Nakamura debuted for the Hokkaido Nippon-Ham Fighters on August 11, 2010. He had 18 strikeouts in 2013 for the Hokkaido Nippon-Ham Fighters. Through 2016 with the Fighters, Nakamura had a 14-16 with a 3.89 ERA and 146 strikeouts. Nakamura did not return to the Fighters after a 2019 season in which he allowed 6 runs in only 2.0 innings of work. In parts of 9 seasons, Nakamura recorded a 15-17 record with a 4.07 ERA and 150 strikeouts.

Nakamura signed on to play for the Brisbane Bandits in the Australian Baseball League for the 2020/2021 season.

Mariachis de Guadalajara
On February 19, 2021, Nakamura signed with the Mariachis de Guadalajara of the Mexican League. Nakamura made 9 appearances, all starts, for Guadalajara in 2021, recording a 3.25 ERA with 46 strikeouts in 52.2 innings of work. Nakamura was voted the LMB Pitcher of the Year following the season.

Orix Buffaloes
On February 23, 2022, Nakamura signed a one-year, training player contract with the Orix Buffaloes of Nippon Professional Baseball.

References

Living people
1991 births
Baseball people from Saitama Prefecture
Nippon Professional Baseball pitchers
Hokkaido Nippon-Ham Fighters players
Orix Buffaloes players
Japanese expatriate baseball players in Mexico
Mariachis de Guadalajara players
Brisbane Bandits players
Japanese expatriate baseball players in Australia
Mexican League Most Valuable Player Award winners